Lavasi Mahalleh (also Romanized as Lavāsī Maḩalleh) is a village in Ahandan Rural District, in the Central District of Lahijan County, Gilan Province, Iran. At the 2006 census, its population was 45, in 13 families.

References 

Populated places in Lahijan County